{{Infobox film
| name           = The Bet
| image          =
| caption        =
| director       = Mark Lee
| producer       =
| writer         =
| starring       = Aden YoungMatthew Newton
| music          =
| cinematography =
| editing        = Jason Ballantine
| studio         = Gerrycan Productions
| distributor    = Madman Entertainment
| released       = 
| runtime        =
| country        = Australia
| language       = English
| budget         =
| gross          = A$25,032 (Australia)<ref>[http://www.film.vic.gov.au/__data/assets/pdf_file/0004/967/AA4_Aust_Box_office_report.pdf "Australian Films at the Australian Box Office", 'Film Victoria] accessed 11 November 2012</ref>
}}The Bet'' is a 2006 film directed by Mark Lee, set in Sydney, Australia. Sibylla Budd was nominated best supporting actress for the 2007 AFI awards.

Plot
The film is a story about a man named Will (Mathew Newton), a young stockbroker, who makes a bet with his wealthy friend Angus (Aden Young) to prove himself and to prove who can make the most money with 50 grand in 90 days for a prize of 200 grand. Their mutual friend Benno, Will's boss tells to invest in a pharmaceutical company. In desperation he agrees to bend for a bit for insider trading. His ego-fueled obsession on the betting game forces him to measure the cost of his ambition against the true value of love. Stock prices hit low and his clients are devastated. His father also invested money with Will and lost it. Will finds out through Benno his girlfriend Tory is working with the pharmaceutical company, Will finds a note at Tory's office and finds out a way he can make back his lost money. Unfortunately, he doesn't find any investors. Will asks Trish (office assistant), whom he has jilted earlier to transfer funds from one of his clients illegally and he uses it to gain profit. Will puts back the money he transferred illegally but is arrested for fraud by officials. Tory who gets him out confronts his betting obsession, tells the pharmaceutical company he was betting against was Agnus's family business and he controls it. Will makes the connection between Benno's advice and Agnus' bet. Will confronts Agnus and he says it's he who recommended Trish in their company through Benno and Benno was bribed handsomely to reel in Will. This was because Tory was Agnus' girlfriend first and he still pines over her. Agnus is beaten up by Will but Agnus manages to pins down Will and asserts he will charge case against Will using Trish as a witness for fraud, market manipulation, insider trading...etc. enough to put Will for a long jail-time which will make Tory forget him. Betrayed and humiliated Will commits suicide. After Will's funeral Trish tells Tory about Agnus' role in Will's suicide.

The bet is a morality tale, set in the city of Sydney, about choosing friends, boundaries and betrayals, relevance and consequences of proto-self, the perils of fallacy and the value of love and life.

Cast
 Matthew Newton as Will
 Sibylla Budd as Tory
 Aden Young as Angus
 Tim Richards as Benno
 Roy Billing as George 
 Alyssa McClelland as Trish

References

External links
 

2006 films
Australian crime drama films
2000s English-language films
Australian thriller drama films
2000s Australian films